Invest Sweden, a.k.a. Invest in Sweden Agency 1995–2010, was a Swedish government agency organised under the Minister for Foreign Affairs, promoting business and investment opportunities in Sweden to foreign investors. The objective was to stimulate an increased flow of foreign direct investment to Sweden.

In 2013, the agency was merged with the organisation Swedish Trade Council, to form a new organisation named Business Sweden.

References

Government of Sweden
Economy of Sweden
Investment promotion agencies
Defunct government agencies of Sweden